The Sunday Footy Show is an Australian sports variety television program covering professional rugby league in Australia. The show is currently hosted by Danika Mason. Also featuring on the show are former rugby league players and current commentators Brad Fittler along with former Jillaroos player Allana Ferguson.

History and synopsis
The show has aired on Sundays since 1993, currently airing from 11am to 1pm. Each episode covers rugby league-related content including previews of the weekend's fixtures and interviews with players. In New South Wales and in Queensland, it airs on Channel Nine, whilst in all other AFL dominated states it is shown on delay on GEM. This would lead into Nine's broadcast of Sunday afternoon football. The telecast into South Australia was controversially cancelled in early 2014 but returned late in 2015. Before 2013, The Sunday Footy Show was not broadcast into the AFL dominated states at all.

The show was formerly hosted by Paul Vautin from 1993−2004, Peter Sterling from 1993−2015, Yvonne Sampson, 2016 and James Bracey in 2017.

The Sunday Roast

In 2012, The Sunday Footy Show incorporated the show's former sister series, The Sunday Roast, which aired in its own right from 2005 to 2011, as a segment as part of the show.

Presenters

Current
 Danika Mason (2022–present, main host)
 Brad Fittler (2010–present) 
 Allana Ferguson (2017–present)
 Joel Caine (2014–present, Sportsbet.com.au updates)

Former
 Paul Vautin (1993–2004, main host)
 Yvonne Sampson (2016)
 Peter Sterling (1993–2015, main host 2005−2015)
 Matthew Johns (2003–2009)
 Steve "Blocker" Roach (1993–1998)
 Andrew Voss (1994–2012) (host/commentator)
 Paul Harragon (2000–2008)
 Ben Ikin (2006–2009) Qld Cup (2012)
 Wendell Sailor (2009–2010)
 Jason Taylor (2010)
 Laurie Daley (2008)
 Darren Lockyer (2012–2017)
 Wally Lewis (2006–2017)
 Scott Sattler (2014−2017, Qld Cup reporter)
 Andrew Johns (2007–2017)

See also

 List of Australian television series
 List of longest-running Australian television series

References

1993 Australian television series debuts
2000s Australian television series
2010s Australian television series
Rugby league television shows
Television shows set in New South Wales
English-language television shows
National Rugby League
Australian sports television series
Nine's Wide World of Sport
Television articles with incorrect naming style